Curt Bader (born January 5, 1961, in Bloomfield, Iowa) is an American sprint canoer who competed from the late 1980s to the mid-1990s. He was eliminated in the semifinals of the K-4 1000 m event at the 1988 Summer Olympics in Seoul.  Eight years later in Atlanta, Bader was eliminated in the semifinals of the same event.

References
Sports-reference.com profile

1961 births
American male canoeists
Canoeists at the 1988 Summer Olympics
Canoeists at the 1996 Summer Olympics
Living people
Olympic canoeists of the United States
People from Bloomfield, Iowa